Salix lanata, the woolly willow, is a subarctic species of willow native to Iceland, the Faeroe Islands and Finland, through to eastern Siberia.

Description
The new twigs are hairy at first, soon becoming hairless and brown. The leaf margins are usually entire.

The catkins appear in summer (May to July), with male and female catkins on separate plants (like all willows this species is dioecious). The female catkins are densely hairy. The petioles are usually less than 1 cm long, and the stipules usually 1 cm long by 0.6 cm wide, and persistent.

The texture, colour and compact nature of this plant, together with its extreme hardiness, make it a valuable plant for cultivation. It has gained the Royal Horticultural Society's Award of Garden Merit.

Gallery

References

External links
 
 
 

lanata
Flora of the Arctic
Flora of Scotland
Flora of Norway
Flora of Sweden
Flora of Finland
Flora of Russia
Flora of the Faroe Islands
Flora of Canada
Flora of Alaska
Flora of the Great Lakes region (North America)
Flora of Michigan
Plants described in 1753
Taxa named by Carl Linnaeus
Flora without expected TNC conservation status